Fillery is a surname. Notable people with the surname include:

Mike Fillery (born 1960), English footballer
Richard Fillery (1842–1881), English cricketer

See also
Filler (surname)